The University of Wisconsin–Madison Arboretum is a teaching and research facility of the University of Wisconsin–Madison and the site of historic research in ecological restoration. In addition to its  in Madison, Wisconsin (located about four miles from the main campus of the University of Wisconsin–Madison), the Arboretum also manages  of remnant forests and prairies throughout Wisconsin. It was designated a National Historic Landmark in 2021, in recognition for its role as a pioneer in the field of ecological restoration.

History 
In 1911, landscape architect John Nolen proposed an arboretum for Madison based on Boston's Arnold Arboretum. The UW Arboretum was founded on April 26, 1932, when the University Board of Regents accepted the deeds to 6 parcels, 246 acres of land on the southwestern end of Madison's Lake Wingra, creating the "University of Wisconsin Forest Preserve Arboretum and Wildlife Refuge". The acreage at the time was mostly farmland fields and pastures. In 1933, G. William Longenecker was named Arboretum Executive Director.  Longenecker Horticultural Gardens would be named after him.  Aldo Leopold was named Research Director and also was the first professor of game management in the U.S.  He was also the first chair of the Department of Game Management at the University of Wisconsin. Leopold and other members of the first Arboretum Committee, especially Professor Norman C. Fassett of the Botany Department, proposed a research agenda around re-establishing "original Wisconsin" landscape and plant communities, particularly those that predated European settlement, such as tallgrass prairie and oak savanna. Between 1935 and 1941, crews from the Civilian Conservation Corps provided most of the labor to accomplish this task under the supervision of Ted Sperry, an ecologist and prairie plant root specialist who had studied with Arthur G. Vestal at the University of Illinois. Such work would eventually become known as ecological restoration. Some of the first tall-grass prairie restorations in the United States took place at the Arboretum. In 2020, Curtis Pond was rehabilitated, and an invasive prairie plant was removed.

In addition to its long-standing commitment to ecological restoration, the Arboretum also features traditional horticultural collections of labeled plants arranged in garden-like displays.

Today the Arboretum manages the oldest restored tall grass prairie in the nation along with an extensive collection of restored ecosystems that are referred to as "ecological communities": woodlands, savannas, prairies, wetlands, springs, and the Lake Wingra shoreline.

Prairies and savannas 
More than 300 species of native plants that once dominated the landscape of southern Wisconsin have been restored to the arboretum's prairies and savannas.
 Curtis Prairie – described as the world's oldest restored prairie; a tallgrass prairie with big bluestem grass and Indian grass.
 Greene Prairie – planted by prairie expert Henry Greene during the 1940s and 1950s.
 Marion Dunn Prairie – restoration of a settling pond.
 Marsh Connection – transition between Curtis Prairie and wetlands.
 Sinaiko Overlook Prairie – mesic to dry-mesic prairie dominated by Indian grass.
 Southwest Grady Oak Savanna – southern Wisconsin fire-adapted communities.
 Wingra Oak Savanna – open-grown bur oaks, being restored by the replacement of its understory of non-native trees, shrubs, and weeds with grassland species.

Deciduous forests 
 Gallistel Woods (28 acres) – will eventually be representative of a southern Wisconsin sugar maple forest.
 Grady Dry Oak Woods – part of the southern Wisconsin fire communities.
 Noe Woods (41 acres) – white oaks and black oaks; the larger oaks are now about 150 years old. Noe woods is named for the Bartlett-Noé (sometimes spelled Noe, without the accent over the “e”) family farm, which was sold by Mrs. Jessie Bartlett Noé to the University in 1933 for inclusion in the Arboretum.
 Wingra Woods (52 acres) – oak woods underplanted with sugar maple, basswood, and beech; gradually changing to a forest with sugar maple as the dominant species.

Conifer forests 
 Boreal Forest (14 acres) – spruce and fir plantings.
 Leopold Pines (21 acres) – red and white pines planted between 1933 and 1937, with small numbers of red maple, white birch, and northern shrubs and ground plants.
 Lost City Forest – mixed woodlands. Originally was intended to be a housing development named Lake Forest in the 1920s, the developer went bankrupt and abandoned the land. There are still some concrete foundations and sidewalks visible in the area.

Wetlands 
 Gardner Marsh – cattails, reed canary grass, exotic shrubs, and other woody vegetation.
 Redwing Marsh – habitat for redwinged blackbirds and waterfowl.
 Southeast Marsh – large wetland.
 Teal Pond Wetlands – sedge meadow and pond, with boardwalks.
 Wingra Marsh – relatively untouched wetlands.

Horticultural collections 

 Longenecker Horticultural Gardens (35 acres) – more than 5,000 plants of more than 2,500 taxa; a leading collection of trees, shrubs and vines in Wisconsin. Major displays of lilacs, flowering crabapples (said to be one of the most complete and up-to-date in the world), viburnums, conifers (including a large collection of arborvitae cultivars), and dozens of other plant groups. More than 100 of Wisconsin's native woody plants are represented in the collections.
 Viburnum Garden – more than 80 species and varieties of viburnums, and 110 species and varieties of arborvitae.
 Wisconsin Native Plant Garden (4 acres) – approximately 500 native Wisconsin plants, with demonstrations for home landscaping.

Recreational use 
In addition to being a research facility, the Arboretum is also a leisure destination for local residents and tourists. It includes 20 miles of hiking trails, 3 miles of biking roads, 10 miles of ski/snowshoe routes. The Arboretum is open to the public daily without charge.

See also 
 List of botanical gardens and arboretums in Wisconsin

References

Further reading

External links 

 University of Wisconsin–Madison Arboretum
 Designing in the Prairie Spirit An online film about the Native Plant Garden at the U of Wisconsin Arboretum at Madison

Arboreta in Wisconsin
Arboretum
Botanical gardens in Wisconsin
Civilian Conservation Corps in Wisconsin
Protected areas of Dane County, Wisconsin
Tourist attractions in Madison, Wisconsin
1932 establishments in Wisconsin
National Register of Historic Places in Dane County, Wisconsin
National Historic Landmarks in Wisconsin